Ashig Alasgar (1821 – 7 March 1926) was an Azerbaijani mystic troubadour (Ashik) and highly regarded poet of Azerbaijani folk songs. He was born in the village of Aghkilsa in the Goycha District of the Erivan Khanate.

Early life 
Ashig Alasgar was born in 1821 in the village of Aghkilse in the Goycha region. His father Almammad worked as a carpenter. At the same time, he was also known as with his intelligence in literature. Almammad was fairly good at poetry genres such as Gerayly, Qoshma and Bayati. It is predicted that Almammad had a huge impact on Ashiq Alasgar.

Ashiq Alasgar grew up in a big and poor family with three brothers and two sisters. He was the eldest son of the family. Due to the financial difficulties in his family, Alasgar was obliged to work on the farm of a rich landowner, Karbalayi Gurban when he was 14. While working here, Alasgar fell in love with 12 years old daughter of Karbalayi Gurban. But due to his social background, he was refused to have such a relationship with agha's daughter and after some time Alasgar was fired.

Ashig Alasgar spent his childhood in the village of Aghkilse and was uneducated. But despite this, he was able to learn the secrets of ashiq art from the elderly ashigs in his village. From his childhood, Alasgar was a careful listener and he was very passionately participated in most events in his village due to his strong memory and story-telling ability, he could manage to memorize almost all ashiq stories (dastans) of that time and. He was playing saz with using his left hand.

Activities 
Ashiq Alasgar is considered one of the great representatives of Azerbaijani folk poetry. His poetries in Gerayly, Qoshma, Mukhammas, Cighali Tecnis, Giphilbend genres have influenced to ashigs of next-generation after him. Ashig Alasgar was almost a master in branches of ashig art and contributed a lot to Azerbaijani literature. Alasgar wrote his first poetries in his adolescence period. Shortly after, his father encouraged him to learn ashig art from one of the famous ashigs in Goycha district, Ashig Ali. After a long term preparation, Alasgar had a chance to participate in a wedding ceremony in his village with Ashig Ali. In that event, everyone appreciated the intelligence of Alasgar as he was able to defeat his instructor Ashiq Ali in a debate (kind of competition between two ashigs) and that event made Alasgar very famous in Goycha region and neighbouring districts. He actively participated in several wedding ceremonies important events in Yerevan, Nakhchivan, Gazakh, Garabagh, Javanshir, Ganja, Kalbajar other regions.

Later life 

Due to concussion from his first love, Alasgar did not marry anyone until he was 40 and then married a girl named Anakhanima from the village Yanshaq in Kalbajar district. In this period of time, Ashig Alasgar was busy with different activities in order to take care of his family. In spring and summertime, he was engaged in agriculture, small construction works and carpentry. But despite all of the above activities, he spent most of his time to the ashig art and wrote several poems. Alasgar was known not only in Azerbaijan but also as a master of ashig art in Turkey, Iran and Dagestan.

Alasgar completed his later life in misery and suffering. In 1915, he lost his brother's son and also his son-in-law at a very young age. After a year, his son Basir murdered the reeve of the village and could escape but instead, several people were arrested from Alasgar's family. During the period of 1918-1919 conflict between Azerbaijanis and Armenians, Alasgar was forced to leave his motherland and migrated to live in Kalbajar and then to Tartar districts. In 1921, he returned to Aghkilse and continued to reside there for the rest of his life.

Ashig Alasgar died on Aghkilse on March 7, 1926.

References

1821 births
1926 deaths
Azerbaijani folk poets
Azerbaijani poets
Azerbaijani centenarians
Ashiks
Men centenarians